LA-39 is a constituency of Azad Kashmir Legislative Assembly which is currently represented by Raja Muhammad Siddique of Pakistan Muslim League (N). It covers the area of Rawalpindi Division Islamabad Khyber Pakhtunkhwa in Pakistan. Only refugees from Jammu and Ladakh settled in Pakistan are eligible to vote.

Election 2016

elections were held in this constituency on 21 July 2016.

Election 2021 
Further Information: Azad Kashmir election 2021

Raja Muhammad Siddique of Pakistan Muslim League (N) won this seat by getting 9557 votes.

Azad Kashmir Legislative Assembly constituencies